The 2019–20 Bowling Green Falcons men's basketball team represent Bowling Green State University in the 2019–20 NCAA Division I men's basketball season. The Falcons, led by 5th-year head coach Michael Huger, play their home games at the Stroh Center in Bowling Green, Ohio as members of the East Division of the Mid-American Conference.

Previous season
The Falcons finished the 2018–19 season 22–12 overall, 12–6 in MAC play to finish second place in the East Division. As the No. 3 seed in the MAC tournament, they defeated Ball State in the quarterfinals, Northern Illinois in the semifinals, advancing to the championship game, where they were defeated by Buffalo. Despite their successful season, they declined any offer to play in a postseason tournament.

Roster

Schedule and results

|-
!colspan=12 style=| Exhibition

|-
!colspan=12 style=| Non-conference regular season

|-
!colspan=12 style=| MAC regular season

|-
!colspan=12 style=| MAC tournament
|-

|-

Source

References

Bowling Green Falcons men's basketball seasons
Bowling Green Falcons
Bowling Green Falcons men's basketball
Bowling Green Falcons men's basketball